The men's 10,000 metres event at the 1952 Olympic Games took place July 20.  The final was won by Emil Zátopek of Czechoslovakia.

Results

Final

Key: DNF = Did not finish, OR = Olympic record

References

Athletics at the 1952 Summer Olympics
10,000 metres at the Olympics
Men's events at the 1952 Summer Olympics